Karighatta is a hill situated a few kilometres outside the 'island' town of Srirangapatna. It is situated off the Bangalore-Mysore Highway just before Srirangapatna in Karnataka state of India.

Etymology
The name Karighatta translates to "Elephant Hill" in Kannada. The hill has a Hindu temple devoted to a form of Hindu god Vishnu, called "Karigirivasa". This deity is also referred to as "Lord Srinivasa" and is also called "Bairagi Venkataramana". The epithet ‘Bairagi’ for this idol is derived from the fact that when ‘alankara’ (flower decoration) is done to the deity, the deity looks like a Bairagi (mendicant).

Geography
The hill stands at a height of 2697 feet above sea level. It supports dry scrub jungle and many tamarind and gooseberry trees are found around the temple. A small river, Lokapavani, a tributary of Kaveri flows by the hill.

Structure of the temple
The main entrance to the temple, with huge wooden doors opens into a large quadrangle, which is the main shrine for Vaikunta Srinivasa in black stone, flanked by Yoga Srinivasa (without his consort) and Bhoga Srinivasa idols. The temple of Goddess Padmavathi is on the western side. Facing the main temple is a statue of Garuda and a Garudasthamba. There is also a Kalyana Mantapa (marriage hall) which is used for performing marriages and other functions. It is believed that the great sage Bhrigu has done the Prathishthapana (installation ceremony) of the deity.

Access

The hill may be climbed by stone steps (450 in number). A winding paved road is used for vehicular transport. The stone steps lead to a flat hilltop where the temple stands. The hillock has a superb panoramic view of Srirangapatna and Mysore. The beautiful landscape around the hill and the confluence of the Kaveri and Lokapavani rivers can be seen from atop the hill.

The famous Nimishamba (the incarnation of Parvathi, the goddess wife of Lord Shiva) temple is on the opposite bank of the Lokapavani river. This temple too can be clearly seen from the top of the Karighatta hill. It is a belief that Parvathi will clear all the problems and troubles of her devotees within a minute (nimisha in Sanskrit), and hence the name.

Mythology 
It is referred in Varaha Purana as ‘Neelachala’, a Sanskrit word, which means 'Blue Mountain.'.  It is believed that performing some aesthetic poojas (worship) at this temple could bring a lot of relief to the sufferings one may have gone through in life.

It is said that the hill got its name after a wild elephant, Kari attacked and killed four girls taking bath. To bring them back to life Sage Kutsamuni undertook a rigorous penance and requested the Lord to save His devotees. Another legend has it that during the building of the bridge to Lanka to bring back Sita, Sugreeva brought this hillock, also called ‘Neelachala’ from Tirumala (Thirupathi). On his way several Vishnubhakhtas (disciples of Lord Vishnu)  pleaded with him to leave it here and so the hill remained here.

At the temple premises, there are sharp grasses, Eragrostis cynosuroides locally known as Dharbe hullu(grass) in Kannada, which is used for performing all sacred rites. In "Varaha Purana" it is said that when Lord Vishnu took the incarnation of Varaha and shook his body some of the body hair fell on the ground near here the grass now seen here is believed to have come from his hair.

Legend has it that it was on this hill that the British had placed their cannons during the siege of Srirangapatnam.

Temple Festivals 

The traditional car festival held every year is believed to have been initiated by sage Vaikhanasa as early as the Treta Yuga. This practice is being continued and annual fair takes place during Kumbha Masa Palguna (February-March), when a large number of pilgrims attend.

Travel 

Karighatta Temple is connected by different modes of transport. Buses are available from Srirangapatna and other neighboring towns. After reaching Mysore it may not be difficult to reach this hill. But you must carry water, food and other requirements for use. No accommodation. You can just visit the temple enjoy the nature’s beauty for few hours and return.

Temple timings: 10am to 2pm and on government holidays 10am to 7pm.

See also
 Karighatta Road
 Nimishamba temple
 Polali Rajarajeshwari Temple

References

External links

Hindu temples in Mysore district